Inside the Girls (女生宿舍, Nu Sheng Su She) is a 2014 Chinese suspense thriller film directed by Liang Ting. It was released on September 12, 2014.

Plot 

A story of two girls who moved into an old haunted dormitory and thereafter, they began getting involved in the mysterious deaths of their roomies. The film is set in 1930s China.

Cast
 Wen Xin 温心 as Xia Mengqian 
 Zhao Duo-na 赵多娜 as Fang Huiru
 Cheng Yi
 Yin Zheng
 Jelly 赵美彤
 Wang Qianyi 王千一
 Du Shuangyu
 Jing Gangshan

Box office
By September 28, it had earned ¥12.36 million at the Chinese box office.

References

2010s thriller films
Chinese thriller films
Chinese suspense films